NGC 269 is an open cluster in the Small Magellanic Cloud. It is located in the constellation Tucana. It was discovered on November 5, 1836 by John Herschel.

References

External links
 

0269
Open clusters
Small Magellanic Cloud
Tucana (constellation)